Kevin John Hart (born 5 July 1954) is an Anglo-Australian theologian, philosopher and poet. He is currently Edwin B. Kyle Professor of Christian Studies and Chair of the Religious Studies Department at the University of Virginia. As a theologian and philosopher, Hart's work epitomizes the "theological turn" in phenomenology, with a focus on figures like Maurice Blanchot, Emmanuel Levinas, Jean-Luc Marion and Jacques Derrida. He has received multiple awards for his poetry, including the Christopher Brennan Award and the Grace Leven Prize for Poetry twice.

Biography
Hart was born on 5 July 1954 to James Henry Hart and his wife, Rosina Mary Wooton. Hart's family moved to Brisbane, Australia, in 1966. Hart attended secondary school at Oxley State High School, and gained his Bachelor of Arts degree in philosophy from the Australian National University. Hart received his PhD from the University of Melbourne in 1986. In 1991 he became Associate Professor of English and Comparative Literature at Monash University, rising to full Professor in 1995 and also becoming Director of the Centre for Comparative Literature and Cultural Studies and the Institute for Critical and Cultural Studies. He also taught in the Centre for Studies in Religion and Theology. Leaving Monash in 2002, he became Professor of Philosophy and Literature at the University of Notre Dame, a position he held until 2007, when he became Edwin B. Kyle Professor of Christian Studies at the University of Virginia, a position he holds as of 2021.

Theology and literary criticism

In his professional life, Kevin Hart is primarily known as a theologian who works in two areas: systematic theology and religion and literature. His work in systematic theology has not yet been collected into volumes but remains as uncollected essays and chapters. In general, Hart's approach is to ground theology in a phenomenology of the Christ, both a phenomenology of Jesus's words and actions, and an account of Jesus as performing epoche and reduction, especially through the parables. On Hart's understanding, the preaching of the Kingdom brings forth Christ's death and that preaching is confirmed by the Resurrection. His work on the Christian mystical tradition is focused on practices of contemplation. In terms of religion and literature, Hart has written extensively on English and French poetry and Christianity, especially Christian mysticism. Recent work has converged on Geoffrey Hill.

One facet of his work is extensive commentary on the writing of the atheist Maurice Blanchot to whom he has devoted four books: The Dark Gaze, The Power of Contestation, Nowhere without No, and Clandestine Encounters. Hart's analysis on Blanchot was praised by Peter Craven as combining "an attractive expository technique with an openness to speculative ideas". His work on Jacques Derrida and Samuel Johnson has also been praised, although one critic said that Hart's work on Johnson was "dubious" "and inconsistent in approach".

Poetry
Hart's interests in poetry were piqued by an English teacher's presentation of Percy Bysshe Shelley's Ozymandias. In addition to Shelley, Hart also cites T. S. Eliot, Charles Baudelaire, Paul Éluard, Vasko Popa, Zbigniew Herbert and Gerard Manley Hopkins as influences. He first began writing poetry as a teenager, partly thanks to a Shelley anthology he had purchased and partly as an excuse to enjoy the Public Library's air conditioning during Brisbane's hot summers.

Critics have noted religious and philosophical themes in Hart's poetry.  As Toby Davidson writes, "Kevin Hart's poetry cannot be separated from his multiple, enduring engagements with mysticism and mystical poetics. He is an innovator, suggesting new approaches to the mystical in the free facets of *attending*." Michael Brennan notes that the philosophical connection stems out of Hart's "long study into phenomenology", specifically connecting Hart's "The Room" to Heidegger's philosophy. Similarly, David McCooey detects the influence of Jacques Derrida, specifically Hart's use of metaphor and perspective.

Erotic and sensual themes are also pronounced in Hart's work. Nathaniel O'Reilly notes, for example, that even though most criticism of Hart focuses on his religious themes, Hart is also an "intensely physical and sensual poet". O'Reilly further says that Hart often links physical sensations with spiritual connections.  Hart's volume Flame Tree was considered, then rejected, for the English Literature Victorian Certificate of Education in Victoria, Australia, on grounds of obscenity. The objectionable line was "My semen hot and wild inside your cunt." In his own defense, Hart claimed, "I was very surprised to think that the line could offend 18-year-olds these days. I suppose there will always be parents who are outraged about something in the curriculum.... In Australia ‘cunt’ is often used by lovers, women and men alike, and no offence need be given or taken. It can be said very tenderly...."

Reception
Hart's poetry has garnered multiple awards, including the Greybeal-Gowen Prize for Poetry in 2008, the John Shaw Neilson Poetry Award in 1977, the Mattara Poetry Award in 1982, 11the Wesley Michel Wright Award in 1984, the NSW Premier's Award in 1985, the Victorian Premier's Award in 1985, the Grace Leven Prize for Poetry in 1991 and 1996, the Christopher Brennan Award in 1999.

Critical response to Hart's poetry has varied. Harold Bloom, writing on the back cover of Kevin Hart's 1999 volume of poetry, Wicked Heat, strongly praised Hart, saying that he is the "most outstanding Australian poet of his generation", and one of "the major living poets in the English language".  Bloom also names Hart as one of the eleven canonical writers of Australia and New Zealand in his book, The Western Canon: The Books and School of the Ages, specifically praising Hart's book Peniel and Other Poems. Other critics, such as Cyril Wong and Christian Sheppard, have also praised Hart's poetry. Some critics such as Geoffrey Lehmann and Pam Brown, however, have expressed negative views of Hart's work. while Christian Sheppard, reviewing the same volume, said "The primary pleasure of Hart's poetry, however, is an easy rhythmed, swiftly flowing line tracing the moment-by-moment impressions of an often impassioned yet always lucid mind". Lehmann, for instance, found Hart's 2008 volume, Young Rain to be self-indulgent and lacking in clear, specific meaning.  Kevin Gardner, an American critic and professor, has noted that Hart's poems "have an annoying tendency toward abstraction" and a "narcissistic symbolism" that frustrates with "surreal obfuscation."  Examples from Hart's poems that Gardner cites include "the curved eyelids of a young hand," "you kiss / Like a slack orchid tongue in Cairns," death "folded tightly / Like a parachute," "let’s eat the splinters in the house," "And filch a little mouse called fear."

Published works
Books of Poetry
The Departure, University of Queensland Press, 1978
The Lines of Your Hand, Angus & Robertson, 1981,  
Your Shadow, HarperCollins Publishers Australia, 1984,  
Peniel Golvan Arts, 1991.  
New and Selected Poems HarperCollins Publishers, 1995,  
Dark Angel, Dedalus Press, 1996,  
Nineteen Songs, Vagabond Press, 1999
Wicked Heat Paper Bark Press, 1999,  
Madonna, Vagabond Press, 2000
Flame Tree Bloodaxe, 2002,  
Night Music, Lexicon House, 2003
Young Rain Bloodaxe Books, 2009,  
Morning Knowledge, University of Notre Dame Press, 2011, 

Criticism
; Fordham Univ Press, 2000,  
A. D. Hope, Oxford University Press, 1992,  
The Oxford Book of Australian Religious Verse, Oxford University Press, 1994,  
Losing the Power to Say ‘I’ (1996)
 
How to Read a Page of Boswell, Vagabond Press, 2000,  
The Fifth Question and After: Poems for Tomas Salamun (2003)
The Impossible Vagabond Press, 2006,  
Nowhere Without No: In Memory of Maurice Blanchot (editor; 2004)
The Power of Contestation: Perspectives on Maurice Blanchot (with Geoffrey Hartman, 2004)
Postmodernism: A Beginner’s Guide (2004)
 

Counter-Experiences: Reading Jean-Luc Marion, University of Notre Dame Press, 2007,  (editor)
The Exorbitant: Emmanuel Levinas between Jews and Christians (with Michael A. Signer, 2010)
Clandestine Encounters: Philosophy in the Narratives of Maurice Blanchot (2010)
Poetry and Revelation: For a Phenomenology of Religious Poetry, Bloomsbury Academic, 2017,

References

External links
"Kevin Hart", Australia – Poetry International Web
 Lachlan Brown 'Exploring the Shadow of Your Shadow' JASAL Special Issue 2007
What We (non)Believe: Reading Poems by Charles Wright, John Burnside, and Kevin Hart from Cordite Poetry Review

1954 births
Living people
Australian poets
English emigrants to Australia
Writers from the Australian Capital Territory
Australian literary critics
English literary critics
Australian National University alumni
University of Melbourne alumni
University of Notre Dame faculty
University of Virginia faculty
English Christians
Australian Christians
Academic staff of Monash University
English male poets
English male non-fiction writers
Christian continental philosophers and theologians